The Mecklenburg Elbe Valley Nature Park is part of the UNESCO biosphere reserve of Elbe River Landscape, which is over 400 river kilometres long and which runs through the five German states of Saxony-Anhalt, Brandenburg, Lower Saxony, Mecklenburg-Vorpommern and Schleswig-Holstein. It lies in the district of Ludwigslust-Parchim in Mecklenburg-Vorpommern. The nature park was created in 1990 and legally established by act of state in 1998.

Characteristic is the original riparian landscape of the Elbe stream with its tributaries, the Schaale, Sude, Krainke, Rögnitz, Löcknitz and the Müritz-Elde Waterway. One feature is the areas of inland dunes with sandy calcareous grassland, woods and heaths as well as the steep sides of the Elbe valley near Boizenburg and Rüterberg (Dömitz), whose observation towers offer panoramic view of the Elbe water meadows.

The nature park lies on the right bank of the Elbe near Elbe km 502-511 and 555-565 and between the state borders of Schleswig-Holstein and Brandenburg. Within the region are the villages of Boizenburg, Lübtheen and Dömitz.

Places of interest are the Lübtheen Reedbed Educational Path, the Dunes Educational Path in the nature reserve near Klein Schmölen, the educational path on the Rüterberg clay pit and another one in the Dammereeze Landscape Park. Of cultural-historical importance is the fortification in Dömitz and unique is the First German Tile Museum (Erstes Deutsches Fliesenmuseum) in the tiled town of Boizenburg/Elbe.

Since 1 January 2009 the nature park management has been aligned with the Schaalsee Biosphere Reserve in order to run it better as a biosphere reserve.

Nature Reserves 
There are 13 nature reserves that lie wholly or partially in the nature park:
 Inland Dunes by Klein Schmölen - 
 Bollenberg by Gothmann - 
 Bretzin Heath - 
 Elbe Dyke Foreland - 
 Vierwald Elbe Hillside - 
 Krainke - 
 Löcknitz Valley-Altlauf - 
 Rögnitzwiesen by Neu Lübtheen - 
 Rüterberg - 
 Schaale river - 
 Schaale Valley from Zahrendorf to Blücher - 
 Sude Valley between Boizenburg and Besitz - 
 Togerwiesen by Garlitz -

See also 
 List of nature parks in Germany

References

External links 
Ordinance establishing the nature park dated 5 February 1998
Mecklenburg Elbe Valley Nature Park

Nature parks in Mecklenburg-Western Pomerania
Ludwigslust-Parchim
Dunes of Germany
Geography of Mecklenburg
Landforms of Mecklenburg-Western Pomerania